Pachani Kapuram is a 1985 Indian Telugu-language romantic drama film directed by T. Rama Rao. The film stars Krishna and Sridevi, with Jaggayya, Kanta Rao, Sowcar Janaki and Master Arjun in supporting roles. It is a remake of the 1985 Hindi film Pyar Jhukta Nahin.

Chakravarthy scored and composed the film's soundtrack. The film was released on 6 September 1985 and emerged a success.

Plot

Cast 
 Krishna as Gopi
 Sridevi as Rekha
 Jaggayya
 Kanta Rao
 Sowcar Janaki
 Master Arjun
 Abhilasha
 Rajya Lakshmi
 Nutan Prasad (Guest Role)
 Y. G. Mahendran (Guest Role)

Soundtrack 
Chakravarthi scored and composed the film's soundtrack album. Veturi Sundararama Murthy penned the lyrics. The song "Tumse Milkar" from Pyar Jhukta Nahin was retained here as "Vennelaina Cheekataina"
 "Koththaga Maththuga" — K. J. Yesudas, S. Janaki
 "Mukku Meedha Kopam" — P. Susheela
 "Vennelaina Cheekataina" (Male) — K. J. Yesudas
 "Vennelaina Cheekataina" (Female) — S. Janaki
 "Vennelaina Cheekataina" (Duet) — S. Janaki, K. J. Yesudas
 "Naa Prema Raagam" — K. J. Yesudas, S. Janaki

References

External links 

1980s Telugu-language films
1985 films
1985 romantic drama films
Films directed by T. Rama Rao
Films scored by K. Chakravarthy
Indian romantic drama films
Telugu remakes of Hindi films